Saivaza is a village and urban commune (municipality) located in the Atsinanana region of eastern Madagascar, It is located in the Antanambao Manampontsy (district).

References

Populated places in Atsinanana